The 2009 Durand Cup Final was the 122nd final of the Durand Cup, the oldest football competition in India and third oldest in the world. The final was contested between two I-League sides, Churchill Brothers SC of Goa and Mohun Bagan AC from Kolkata. It was held on 22 September 2009 in New Delhi.

Churchil Brothers won their second Durand Cup final after 2007, with a score of 3–1. Odafe Okolie scored a hat trick for Churchill Brothers.

Route to the final

Churchill Brothers 

Churchill Brothers entered the 2009 Durand Cup as one of the I-League teams and the runner-up from the previous season. They were placed in Group A along with Sporting Clube de Goa and an Indian Armed Forces team, Assam Rifles. In the opening game, Churchil Brothers defeated Sporting Clube de Goa 1–0. In the second game, they drew against Assam rifles with both teams scoring each. They topped the group and ended their group stage campaign with four points. The first semi-final was held on 19 September 2009, where Churchill Brothers faced Dempo, and defeated them 2–1. Odafe Okolie scoried a brace in the 20th and 50th minute and the team reached their third successive Durand Cup final.

Mohun Bagan 

Mohun Bagan entered the 2009 Durand Cup as one of the I-League teams. They were allocated Group B with ONGC and JCT. Mohun Bagan won both group stage matches with a score line of 5–1  and 2–0 against ONGC and JCT respectively. They topped the group and ended their group stage campaign with six points. The second semi-final was held in September 2009, where Mohun Bagan defeated Mahindra United by a score of 2–1. Chidi Edeh scored both goals for Mohun Bagan in 19th and 72nd minute.

Match 
The final was played on 22 September 2009 at the Ambedkar Stadium in New Delhi. The match remained goalless in the regulation time and it went for extra time. Chidi Edeh scored the first goal in the 94th minute, for Mohun Bagan. Six minutes later, Odafa scored the equaliser and went on scoring two more goals in the 104th and 110th minute. He scored a hat trick in ten minutes and sealed the second Durand Cup title for Churchil brothers. The final scoreline was 3–1.

Details

See also 

 2009 IFA Shield

References

External links 
 Official website

Durand Cup finals
Mohun Bagan AC matches
Churchill Brothers FC Goa matches
India
2009–10 in Indian football